Carlos Mayo Nieto (born 18 September 1995 in Madrid) is a Spanish long-distance runner.

He won three medals in the European Athletics U23 Championships. He won a bronze medal in the 5000 metres at the 2015 European U23 Championships and two years later, a gold medal in the 10000 metres and a bronze medal in the 5000 metres at the 2017 European U23 Championships.

International competitions

Personal bests
Outdoor
1500 metres – 3:36.44 (Barcelona 2021)
3000 metres – 7:48.29 (Ibiza 2021)
5000 metres – 13:18.15 (Chorzow 2021)
10000 metres – 27:25.00 (Birmingham 2021)
Half marathon - 1h00:06 (Valencia 2020)

Indoor
1500 metres – 3:49.01 (San Sebastián 2016)
3000 metres – 7:45.54 (Barcelona 2021)

References

All-Athletics profile

External links
 
 
 
 

1995 births
Living people
Spanish male long-distance runners
Athletes from Madrid
Olympic athletes of Spain
Athletes (track and field) at the 2020 Summer Olympics